The 2019 Martyr's Memorial B-Division League was the 2019 season of the Martyr's Memorial B-Division League. A total of 12 teams competed in the league. The season started on 8 February and concluded on 5 March. The league did not have promotion to the Martyr's Memorial A-Division League and teams were not relegated to the Martyr's Memorial C-Division League, the bottom teams of each group however will have a one point deduction in the next edition of the league.

Teams 

A total of 12 teams compete in the league, including 10 sides from the 2016 season and two sides promoted from the 2016 Martyr's Memorial C-Division League.

Team Changes

Location

Personnel and kits

First round

Group A

Group B

Final Round

Season statistics

Top scorers

Hat-tricks

Awards

References 

Martyr's Memorial B-Division League seasons
2018–19 in Nepalese football